Wendell Williams (born October 19, 1968 on Trinidad) is a retired male track and field athlete from Trinidad and Tobago who specialized in the long jump. After competing in the 1993 World Championships in Stuttgart, Germany he moved to Berlin, Germany for a half year training stint. Eventually he stayed for more than seven years in Germany.

Achievements

References

External links
Best of Trinidad
sports-reference

1968 births
Living people
Trinidad and Tobago male long jumpers
Athletes (track and field) at the 1991 Pan American Games
Athletes (track and field) at the 1994 Commonwealth Games
Athletes (track and field) at the 1996 Summer Olympics
Athletes (track and field) at the 1998 Commonwealth Games
Athletes (track and field) at the 2000 Summer Olympics
Olympic athletes of Trinidad and Tobago
Commonwealth Games bronze medallists for Trinidad and Tobago
Commonwealth Games medallists in athletics
Pan American Games competitors for Trinidad and Tobago
Central American and Caribbean Games gold medalists for Trinidad and Tobago
Competitors at the 1990 Central American and Caribbean Games
Competitors at the 1993 Central American and Caribbean Games
Competitors at the 1998 Central American and Caribbean Games
Central American and Caribbean Games medalists in athletics
Medallists at the 1998 Commonwealth Games